This is a list of temples built by Antoinism, a new religious movement founded in the early 20th century in Belgium, presented by country and in chronological order. A temple is a building in which the worship is performed by the antoinist clergy twice per day, at 10 a.m. and 7 p.m., except on Friday and Saturday, with few differences in France and in Belgium. All the buildings belong to the "Antoinist Worship" association, but one of them in Belgium is connected to the asbl "Les Disciples de Père et de Mère Antoine". There are currently 64 temples worldwide: 32 in Belgium, 31 in France and one in Monaco.

Historically, most of antoinist temples in Belgium were built before the World War II, when at least one of the founders was still alive. The first temple, the one of Jemeppe-sur-Meuse, was consecrated two years before the death of Louis Antoine, the founder of the religion. Other temples were often built in Belgian spa towns or in the countryside, and are mostly gathered in the French-speaking region — there are only three temples located in the Flanders region — and particularly in the province of Liège which counts 21 buildings. However, no temple has been built since 1968 and the antoinism spreading is now on the decline in the country, so much so that several places of worship are being unused because of a lack of clergy members. One of them — the temple in Tournai — was even sold in 2001.

By contrast, the constructions of the temples in France has been continued until 1993. The first place of worship was consecrated in 1913 in the 13th arrondissement of Paris. At present, there is an antoinist temple in the majority of main cities in France, although most of them are located in the north of Paris, especially in the Nord department where five temples are operating.

All the temples are built with anonymous donations or patronage.

Temples in Belgium

Temples in France

Bibliography

Notes

External links

  Culteantoiniste.com, list of temples
  Antoinisme.org, photos, history, architecture, press articles, etc., about antoinist temples (see the list of the temples on the left, click on one of them for more details)

Antoinism
Antoinist